The flag of Drenthe is the official flag of the Dutch province of Drenthe and was adopted on 19 February, 1947. The colours of the flag (red and white) are those of the Archbishop of Utrecht by whom Drenthe was governed in the past. The black castle is meant to represent the Castle of Coevorden, where the rebellion against the bishop Otto II began. Finally, the six stars is meant to represent the former six fehmic courts.

References 

Flag
Flags of the Netherlands
Flags introduced in 1947